Jiřina Bohdalová (born 3 May 1931 in Prague, Czechoslovakia, now the Czech Republic) is a Czech actress.

Career 
She began acting in theatre and film at an early age. She was accepted to The Theatre Faculty of the Academy of Performing Arts in Prague (DAMU) at her third attempt. She received an offer from Jan Werich to join the actor's troupe at Divadlo ABC theatre which she accepted. Later on, she performed in many other “City Theatres of Prague” (Městská divadla pražská). From 1967 to the present day, she has a permanent engagement at the “Vinohrady Theatre”. Bohdalová has done extensive work as a voice actress, especially TV characters in various bedtime stories, including “The Fairy-tales from Moss and Fern” (Pohádky z mechu a kapradí, 1968), “The Little Reedman” (Rákosníček, 1977), “The Little Witch” (Malá čarodějnice, 1984), “About the Pixie Racochejl” (O skřítku Racochejlovi, 1997), etc. She has made numerous appearances in different fairy-tales, short stories, TV films, serials, plays and many programmes of her own.

She has won two Czech Lion awards for her roles in Nesmrtelná teta and Fany. She is the mother of actress Simona Stašová.

The StB attempted to blackmail Bohdalová into becoming an informant, but she resisted this effort. After the publication of a register of StB collaborators which included her name, she successfully had the error of her inclusion rectified.

Jiřina Bohdalová came under suspicion in the 1990s of having collaborated with the communist secret police StB. However, it turned out in court that she had been wrongly included in the secret police's lists of collaborators, which were made public, even though her family was persecuted in the 1950s and her father spent six years in prison.

References

External links

Jiřina Bohdalová biography
Kveta Mysteries on Eurochannel

1931 births
Living people
20th-century Czech actresses
21st-century Czech actresses
Actresses from Prague
Czech Lion Awards winners
Czech film actresses
Czech stage actresses
Czech television actresses
Czech television personalities
Czech voice actresses
Recipients of Medal of Merit (Czech Republic)
Recipients of the Order of the White Lion
Recipients of the Thalia Award